Ernest Tursunov (Турсунов Эрнис Нурдинович) (24 August 1935 – 11 June 2014) was a Kyrgyzstani poet.

His list of publications includes also translations, controversially, of the Quran from Russian into Kyrgyz, and a Kyrgyz New Testament.

References 

1935 births
2014 deaths
Kyrgyzstani poets
Quran translators
Translators to Kyrgyz
Translators of the Bible into Kyrgyz
20th-century poets
20th-century translators
20th-century Kyrgyzstani writers